The 2015–16 Kansas Jayhawks women's basketball team represented the University of Kansas in the 2015–16 NCAA Division I women's basketball season. The Jayhawks were led by first year head coach Brandon Schneider. They played their home games at Allen Fieldhouse in Lawrence, Kansas and were members of the Big 12 Conference. They finished the season 6–25, 0–18 in Big 12 play to finish in last place. They advanced to the quarterfinals of the Big 12 women's tournament where they lost to Texas.

Roster

Schedule and results 

|-
!colspan=12 style="background:#0022B4; color:white;"| Exhibition

|-
!colspan=12 style="background:#0022B4; color:white;"| Non-conference regular season

|-
!colspan=12 style="background:#0022B4; color:white;"| Big 12 regular season

|-
!colspan=12 style="background:#0022B4; color:white;"| Big 12 Women's Tournament

x- All JTV games will air on Metro Sports, ESPN3 and local affiliates.

See also 
 2015–16 Kansas Jayhawks men's basketball team

References 

Kansas Jayhawks women's basketball seasons
Kansas
Kansas Jayhawks women's basketball
Kansas Jayhawks women's basketball